The 2023 OL Reign season will be the team's eleventh season of play and their eleventh season in the National Women's Soccer League, the top division of women's soccer in the United States.

Team

Coaching staff

Current roster

Competitions 

All times are in PT unless otherwise noted.

Preseason and friendlies

Thorns Preseason Tournament

Regular season

Regular-season standings

Results summary

Results by matchday

Playoffs

Challenge Cup

Divisional standings

Appearances and goals

Transfers
For incoming transfers, dates listed are when OL Reign officially signed the players to the roster. Transactions where only the rights to the players are acquired (e.g., draft picks) are not listed. For outgoing transfers, dates listed are when OL Reign officially removed the players from its roster, not when they signed with another team. If a player later signed with another team, her new team will be noted, but the date listed here remains the one when she was officially removed from the OL Reign roster.

Transfers in

Draft picks

Draft picks are not automatically signed to the team roster. Only those who are signed to a contract will be listed as incoming transfers.

Transfers out

Loans in

Loans out

New contracts

Awards

References

External links 
 

OL Reign seasons
2023 in sports in Washington (state)

American soccer clubs 2023 season